Covenhoven House is located in Freehold Borough, Monmouth County, New Jersey, United States. The house was built in 1752–53 by William and Elizabeth Covenhoven. The builder of the historic Old Tennent Church was retained for the job, and began work right after the completion of the church.  In 1778, General Henry Clinton occupied this house as his headquarters from June 26 to the morning of June 28th, prior to the Battle of Monmouth that day.

Clinton chose the house because it was clearly the finest home in the area.  When he arrived there, he realized that Mrs. Covenhoven had already prepared for their visit. The house was devoid of the fine furnishings one would expect in such a home. The valuables had been hidden away in the woods, and the silver and china had been buried in the yard under some rose bushes.  Clinton convinced Mrs. Covenhoven that her fine things would not be safe in the woods.  If she returned them to the home, he said, they would be under the protection of the British army. She finally acquiesced, and the hidden wagon load was brought back to the house. According to a complaint she filed with the courthouse, she stated that once the wagon arrived, she was not allowed to bring anything inside the home. By the morning, the entire wagon had been picked over, and everything was stolen except for a few small trifles.  One small mercy that was done for her by Clinton was that he did not destroy the home, as the army had burned down several homes in the immediate area.

Covenhoven House added to the National Register of Historic Places on May 1, 1974.  The house is one of several houses owned and operated as a historic house museum by the Monmouth County Historical Association.  It is open Friday-Sun from 1-4 pm. Admission is $5 for adults, $2.50 for children and seniors.

References

External links

 Monmouth County Historical Association

 https://monmouthhistory.org/visit/historic-houses/#covenhoven-house
 http://tourism.visitmonmouth.com/covenhoven-house/
 https://revolutionarynj.org/places/covenhoven-house/
 https://www.journeythroughjersey.com/sites/covenhoven-house/
 https://www.visitnj.org/nj-historic-sites-memorials/covenhoven-house

Freehold Borough, New Jersey
Historic house museums in New Jersey
Houses completed in 1706
Houses in Monmouth County, New Jersey
Houses on the National Register of Historic Places in New Jersey
Museums in Monmouth County, New Jersey
National Register of Historic Places in Monmouth County, New Jersey
1706 establishments in New Jersey
New Jersey Register of Historic Places
Historic American Buildings Survey in New Jersey